David Allan-Petale is a Western Australian writer and journalist who previously worked for the Australian Broadcasting Corporation.

Locust Summer 
His debut novel Locust Summer was published by Fremantle Press in 2021 and is set in the Western Australian wheatbelt in 1986. The book concerns Rowan Brockman who becomes heir to his family farm after the death of his brother Albert. Rowan is unable to deny his mother's request to stay and help with preparations for the sale of the farm. The story is about the farm's final harvest.

The Australian Women's Weekly described the novel as  a "‘powerfully poignant, beautifully crafted debut …’

Locust Summer was shortlisted for the 2021 WA Premier's Book Awards and for the  Australian/Vogel's Literary Award, an unpublished manuscript award for under-35 year old Australian writers in 2017.

The book was developed through a fellowship at Varuna, the National Writers’ House.

References 

Australian writers
Australian journalists
Australian Broadcasting Corporation people
Al Jazeera people
Year of birth missing (living people)
Living people